inositol-1,3,4-trisphosphate 5/6-kinase (Ins(1,3,4)P3 5/6-kinase, inositol trisphosphate 5/6-kinase) is an enzyme with systematic name ATP:1D-myo-inositol 1,3,4-trisphosphate 5-phosphotransferase. This enzyme catalyses the following chemical reaction

 (1) ATP + 1D-myo-inositol 1,3,4-trisphosphate  ADP + 1D-myo-inositol 1,3,4,5-tetrakisphosphate
 (2) ATP + 1D-myo-inositol 1,3,4-trisphosphate  ADP + 1D-myo-inositol 1,3,4,6-tetrakisphosphate

In humans, this enzyme, along with EC 2.7.1.127 (inositol-trisphosphate 3-kinase), EC 2.7.1.140 (inositol-tetrakisphosphate 5-kinase) and EC 2.7.1.158 (inositol pentakisphosphate 2-kinase) is involved in the production of inositol hexakisphosphate (InsP6).

References

External links 
 

EC 2.7.1